Every Man His Own Broker; or A Guide to the Stock Exchange, is a book on economics by Thomas Mortimer, published in 1761 and enjoying 14 editions over the next four decades. It is considered one of the first books on guides to stock trading.

Mortimer traded at Jonathan's Coffee-House in Exchange Alley, which served as the country's stock exchange in 18th century London. He is often critical of some brokers and traders there, advising individuals to not depend on them.

In the book, Mortimer famously said:

This refers to the former practice of stock-brokers, abolished circa 1980's in London, allowing their clients to trade on credit during a period of about two weeks, known as an account, on the completion of which all purchases and sales made during the account period had to be paid for on the settlement date. A net trading loss would result in the client having to make a cash payment to the broker.

By its 12th edition, the book had been translated into German, French, Dutch, and Spanish.

References

External links
 Full text of Every Man His Own Broker; or A Guide to the Stock Exchange

18th-century books